Obaidullah Khan Shadikhel is a Pakistani politician who had been a member of the National Assembly of Pakistan, from August 2013 to May 2018.

Political career
He ran for the seat of the National Assembly of Pakistan as a candidate of Pakistan Muslim League (Q) (PML-Q) from Constituency NA-71 (Mianwali-I) in 2002 Pakistani general election, but was unsuccessful. He received 60,533 votes and lost the seat to Imran Khan.

He was elected to the National Assembly as a candidate of Pakistan Muslim League (N) (PML-N) from Constituency NA-71 (Mianwali-I) in by-election held in August 2013. He received 69,799 votes and defeated a candidate of Pakistan Tehreek-e-Insaf. The seat became vacant after Imran Khan who won it in 2013 general election vacated it in order to retain the National Assembly seat he won in Constituency NA-56 (Rawalpindi-VII).

References

Living people
Pakistan Muslim League (N) politicians
Punjabi people
Pakistani MNAs 2013–2018
Year of birth missing (living people)